New World Agenda is the second studio album by West Coast rapper Big Bad 4-0. It was released on January 31, 2012, with Havoc and 50 Cent serving as executive producers. The album never charted.

Concept
The album's artwork features Big Bad 4-0 sitting front of a small ancient cave, with three bullets; the first has writing that says "A Broken Clock Is Right Twice A Day", the second says "Freedom", and the third reads "Do What Thou Wilt".

Background
After releasing his previous collaboration album with his group, Zoo Life, in December 2009, Big Bad 4-0 began plotting to release his next album, entitled New World Agenda. It was originally slated for a late summer 2010 release, but was pushed back as more singles were released. This being his first studio album since 2003's The Jakal, meant that he would need to develop a "buzz," for the album, but after numerous notable encounters with rappers, Rick Ross, Plies, Lil Wayne, Birdman and Tyga, as well as an ongoing battle with over a supposed gang injunction against the Colton Police Department, he has had the confidence to release two singles for the album to date. Major labels began to take note of this, and eventually, 40 Glocc managed to land a deal with Fontana Distribution, in distributing his Zoo Life Entertainment brand, as well as releasing the album on the label.

Singles
"Damn" was the first  and lead single off the album, featuring R&B singer Ray-J and released on May 25, 2010. The official music video to the song was released on July 14, 2010, and it features cameo appearances by Ray-J, Cashis, Zoo Life, and Sun. The official remix to the song is featuring Yo Gotti & Twista.

"Welcome 2 California," was the second official single off the album on July 6, 2010, and features Sevin on the chorus of the song. The official remix features MC Eiht, E-40, Snoop Dogg, Too Short, B.G. Knocc Out, & Xzibit. This remix was released July 13, 2010, and the music video was released on July 20, 2011.

Track list

References 

2012 albums
Gangsta rap albums by American artists